Boy Kills Man is 2004 novel by British novelist Matt Whyman about child assassins in Medellin, Colombia.

Characters
Shorty is the main character of this book. When his friend Alberto gets mixed up with guns and gangs, he soon follows.
Alberto is Shorty's best friend. He becomes involved with a gang which leads to him becoming an assassin and his eventual disappearance.

Awards
Booktrust Teenage Prize (2004)
Stockport Schools' Book Award (2005)
De Jong Jury (Netherlands) (2006)
Wirral Paperback of the Year (2006)

Notes

2004 British novels
British young adult novels
Novels set in Colombia
Medellín
Hodder & Stoughton books